The Danish National Road Race Championships were created in 1897.

Men

U23

Women

See also
Danish National Time Trial Championships
National road cycling championships

References

External links
List of national champions – Danmarks Cykle Union

National road cycling championships
Cycle races in Denmark
Recurring sporting events established in 1897
1897 establishments in Denmark